Major-General Philip James Shears CB (1887–1972) was a senior officer in the British Army.

He was born on 6 April 1887 in Surbiton, Surrey, the only son of James Charles Shears, a mechanical engineer from Kingston upon Thames, Surrey, and Beatrice Jane Margaret Dumas.  He was also a great-grandson of coppersmith Daniel Towers Shears, a partner of James Shears and Sons.

He went on to serve as Colonel of The Border Regiment (now part of The King's Own Royal Border Regiment) from 1947 to 1952.

In 1948 Philip Shears published The Story of the Border Regiment, 1939-1945.

He died on 7 April 1972.

References
 Military record

1887 births
1972 deaths
Royal Dublin Fusiliers officers
Royal Hampshire Regiment officers
Border Regiment officers
British Army personnel of World War I
British Army generals of World War II
People from Surbiton
Companions of the Order of the Bath
Military personnel from Surrey
British Army major generals